Refuge Astronomer Cruls is a Brazilian Antarctic summer facility named after astronomer Luis Cruls who set up an expedition in 1882 to Punta Arenas in order to observe the passage of Venus across the disk of the Sun.  The structure, established on 25 January 1985, is situated on Nelson Island (South Shetland Islands), southwest of King George Island, South Shetland Islands, Antarctica.

The refuge, which can accommodate up to 6 scientists for up to 40 days, depends both logistically and administratively on Comandante Ferraz station. Together with Refuge Emílio Goeldi, located on Elephant Island, constitute the basic infra-structure to support the Brazilian Antarctic Program in Antarctica.

See also
 List of Antarctic research stations
 List of Antarctic field camps

References

Brazilian Antarctica
Outposts of the South Shetland Islands
Outposts of Antarctica
1985 establishments in Antarctica